Argodrepana is a genus of moths belonging to the subfamily Drepaninae.

Species
 Argodrepana verticata Warren, 1907
 Argodrepana galbana Wilkinson, 1967
 Argodrepana auratifrons Warren, 1922
 Argodrepana denticulata Wilkinson, 1967
 Argodrepana tenebra Wilkinson, 1967
 Argodrepana umbrosa Wilkinson, 1967
 Argodrepana marilo Wilkinson, 1970

References

 , 1970: A new species of Argodrepana and records of other white Drepanidae (Lepidoptera) from New Guinea. Pacific Insects 12 (2): 241–250.
 , 1977: A taxonomic study of a new genus of Drepanidae (Lepidoptera) from New Guinea. Proceedings of the Royal Entomological Society of London Series B 36 (1/2): 17–29. 

Drepaninae
Drepanidae genera